Cassa di Risparmio di Saluzzo is an Italian saving bank. The bank was based in Saluzzo, in the Province of Cuneo, Piedmont.

Since the bank reforms in 1991, the bank was split into a società per azioni and a non-profit banking foundation. Cassa di Risparmio di Torino (Banca CRT) once became a minority shareholders of the bank. However its successor, UniCredit sold their possession on Saluzzo (31.019%), Bra (31.021%), Fossano (23.077%) and Savigliano (31.006%) to Banca Popolare dell'Emilia Romagna for about €149 million in 2006. (which BPER paid €45.384 million for CR Saluzzo's shares)

As at 31 December 2014 the foundation owned 66.98%, followed by BPER 31.019% and Argentario 2%.

In 2016 a plan to purchase the controlling stake from the foundation was announced. It was part of a reform in banking foundation, forcing them to diversify investments. In December BPER purchased an additional 20% of the bank to completely privatized CR Saluzzo.

See also

 Cassa di Risparmio di Cuneo

References

Banks established in 1901
Italian companies established in 1901
Banks of Italy
Companies based in Piedmont
Saluzzo
BPER Banca